Uliana Iskrytska (?-1742), was the Hetmana of the Cossack Hetmanate by marriage to Danylo Apostol, Hetman of Ukraine (r. 1727-1734).  She was known for her charity and donations to the church, and occasionally played a political role.

References

Year of birth unknown
Date of death unknown
1742 deaths

18th-century Ukrainian people
People from the Cossack Hetmanate